Gabrielle de Vietri (born 1983) is a member of the Victorian Greens elected in the 2022 Victorian state election for the electoral district of Richmond.

Life and career
She worked as a professional artist until 2019, undertaking numerous residencies and grant projects.

In 2020, de Vietri ran for the City of Yarra as a councillor for Langridge Ward, and was elected. She soon became Mayor of the City of Yarra.

De Vietri announced in August 2022 that she would be taking leave from her role at the City of Yarra due to her running in the 2022 state election. She was then announced as the Greens candidate for the division of Richmond. De Vietri was successful in this election.

Personal life
De Vietri identifies as queer, making her the first openly LGBTQ woman elected to the Victorian Legislative Assembly.

References

1983 births
Living people
Victorian College of the Arts alumni
Monash University alumni
Artists from Victoria (Australia)
Australian women artists
Mayors of Yarra
Women mayors of places in Victoria (Australia)
Members of the Victorian Legislative Assembly
Women members of the Victorian Legislative Assembly
Australian Greens members of the Parliament of Victoria
LGBT legislators in Australia
Victoria (Australia) local councillors